The women's 5000 metres event at the 2014 Asian Games was held at the Incheon Asiad Main Stadium, Incheon, South Korea on 2 October.

Schedule
All times are Korea Standard Time (UTC+09:00)

Records

Results

 Betlhem Desalegn of the United Arab Emirates originally got the 10th place, but was disqualified because of her biological passport abnormalities.

References

Results

5000 metres women
2014 women